Lošany is a municipality and village in Kolín District in the Central Bohemian Region of the Czech Republic. It has about 300 inhabitants.

Administrative parts
The village of Lošánky is an administrative part of Lošany.

Notable people
Josef Mašín (1896–1942), resistance fighter

References

Villages in Kolín District